The 2017–18 Biathlon World Cup – Stage 1 was the opening event of the season and was held in Östersund, Sweden, from 26 November until 3 December 2017.

Schedule of events

Medal winners

Men

Women

Mixed

References 

Biathlon World Cup - Stage 1, 2017-18
2017–18 Biathlon World Cup
Biathlon World Cup - Stage 1
Biathlon World Cup - Stage 1
Sports competitions in Östersund
Biathlon competitions in Sweden